Marc Bouillon (born 15 June 1968 in Soignies) is a Belgian former cyclist.

Major results 
1991
 10th GP de Fourmies
1992
 2nd Grand Prix de Wallonie
 4th Circuit des Frontières
 9th Paris–Camembert
1993
 1st Cholet-Pays de Loire
 8th De Brabantse Pijl
1994
 1st Stage 1 Circuit Franco-Belge
 1st Stages 2 & 4 Tour de Namur
1996
 1st Route Adélie de Vitré
 1st Tour d'Armorique
 1st Stage 5 Quatre Jours de l'Aisne
 7th GP de la Ville de Rennes

Grand Tour general classification results timeline

External links 
 

Belgian male cyclists
1968 births
Living people
People from Soignies
Cyclists from Hainaut (province)